Llíria Club de Fútbol was a Spanish football team based in Llíria, in the Valencian Community. Founded in 1943 as Club de Fútbol Llíria, the club changed name to Llíria CF in 1982, and was dissolved in 2020 after they merged with Atlètic Llíria to form Llíria UD.

Season to season

2 seasons in Segunda División B
7 seasons in Tercera División

References

External links
BDFutbol team profile
Fútbol Regional team profile 

Football clubs in the Valencian Community
Association football clubs established in 1943
Association football clubs disestablished in 2020
1943 establishments in Spain
2020 disestablishments in Spain